Françoise Winnik (2 March 1952 – 13 February 2021) was a French-born Canadian chemical researcher and professor.

Winnink was born and raised in France, where she earned her undergraduate degree in chemical engineering at the National School of Chemistry in Mulhouse, France in 1973. She finished her master's degree and PhD in Toronto, Canada in 1974 and 1979 respectiviely. She later became associate professor at the University of Montreal. the chemistry and physics departments at McMaster University in Canada. In 2018 she moved to Finland and worked at the University of Helsinki. She was elected Foreign Member of The Finnish Society of Sciences and Letters in 2013.

Winnik died in her hometown Helsinki on 13 February 2021.

Publications 
 2001. S. Mansouri, Y. Mehri, F. M. Winnik, M. Tabrizian. « Investigation of the layer-by-layer assembly onto fully functional human red blood cells in suspension for attenuated immune response », dans Biomacromolecules, 2001, 12, pp. 585–592.
 2010. V. A. Kryuchkov. J. C. Daigle, K. M. Skupov, J. Claverie, F. M. Winnik. « Amphiphilic polyethylenes leading to surfactant-free thermoresponsive nanoparticles », dans Journal of American Chemistry Society, 2010, 133(44), pp. 15573–15579.

Awards 
2015 : Lauréate du prix Acfas Urgel-Archambault

References

1952 births
2021 deaths
French academics
French women academics
Academic staff of the University of Helsinki
Canadian women academics
Scientists from Mulhouse
Academic staff of McMaster University